Joseph Rago (January 6, 1983 – July 20, 2017) was a Pulitzer Prize-winning American political writer, best known for his work at The Wall Street Journal.

Education
Rago attended Falmouth High School in Falmouth, Massachusetts, where he was president of the National Honor Society. He graduated in 2001.

Rago graduated with a degree in American history from Dartmouth College in 2005. While there, he wrote for The Dartmouth Review, an independent conservative student newspaper, serving as its editor-in-chief in 2005, and on its board after his graduation.

Career
Rago joined The Wall Street Journal in 2005 as an intern and rose from an assistant editor on the op-ed page to editorial writer to a member of the editorial board.
Rago was also a 2010 media fellow at the Stanford University Hoover Institution.

Rago was known for being an outspoken critic of the Patient Protection and Affordable Care Act. In 2011, he captured the Pulitzer Prize for Editorial Writing for what the Pulitzer organization called his "well crafted, against-the-grain editorials challenging the health care reform advocated by President Obama."

Death
In July 2017, Rago was found dead at his East Village, Manhattan apartment; he was 34 years old. In September 2017, New York City's medical examiner office released a statement confirming his cause of death to be sarcoidosis.

References

External links

Dartmouth Now

1983 births
2017 deaths
21st-century American non-fiction writers
American columnists
American male non-fiction writers
American political commentators
American political writers
American social commentators
Dartmouth College alumni
People from Falmouth, Massachusetts
Pulitzer Prize for Editorial Writing winners
The Wall Street Journal people
Writers from Massachusetts
People from the East Village, Manhattan
21st-century American male writers
Deaths from sarcoidosis
Falmouth High School (Massachusetts) alumni